Thiruvambady is a major hill town and a suburb in southeastern Kozhikode district in Kerala, India.

Geography
The town is surrounded by mountains, valleys, and waterfalls, such as Thusharagiri Falls and Aripara Falls.

Administration
Thiruvambady is under Koduvally Block Panchayat and Thamarassery Taluk.

Thiruvambady is part of the Wayanad parliamentary constituency. The current MP is Rahul Gandhi.

In 1977, the Thiruvambady assembly constituency of the Kerala Legislative Assembly was established, consisting of 7 Panchayats. The current MLA is Linto Joseph.

Transportation

Road
Thiruvambady is well connected by road to nearby places. It can be reached by the following routes:
 Thiruvananthapuram - Kochi - Guruvayoor/Thrissur - Pattambi - Perinthalmanna - Manjeri - Areekode - Mukkam  - Thiruvambady
 Kozhikode - Kunnamangalam - REC (NIT) - Mukkam (Agastiamuzhi)  - Thiruvambady
 Kannur - Koyilandy - Thamarassery - Omassery - Thiruvambady
 Wayanad - Kalpetta - Adivaram - Kaithapoyil - Kodenchery - Thiruvambady
 Nilambur - Akambadam - Kakkadampoyil - Koombara - Koodaranhi - Thiruvambady
 Koduvally - Omassery - Thiruvambady - Pulloorampara - Anakkampoyil

Buses
A KSRTC bus operating centre is in town, as well as a private bus stand. There are buses to nearby places such as Kozhikode, Mukkam, Omassery, Thamarassery, Koduvally, Pulloorampara, Anakkampoyil, Poovaranthode, Koodaranji, and Kodenchery; and KSRTC operates many inter-district routes.

KSRTC buses operates many inter district services from here.

Rail
The nearest railway station is Kozhikode Railway Station,  distant.

Air
The nearest airport is Calicut International Airport,  distant. 

Thiruvambady International Airport is a new airport proposal for Calicut city. Restrictions on larger aircraft landing at the existing airport for safety considerations has been reported as one rationale for building a new airport.

Distance chart
The Kilometer chart from Thiruvambady is given below:

Notable people from Thiruvambady
 Mathai Chacko – Former MLA and communist leader
 Jacob Thoomkuzhy – Former metropolitan archbishop

Gallery

References

Cities and towns in Kozhikode district